Oj Srbijo, mila mati, translated "O Serbia, Dear Mother", is a Serbian patriotic song. It dates to the 19th century. Its first, longer version, Srbiji ("to Serbia") by poet Luka Sarić was published in 1860 in the literary magazine of Slovenka in Novi Sad. In 1891, a Czech migrant to Serbia, Vojtěch Šístek, a member of the Singing Association Branko in Niš, composed the melody and the song quickly became very popular. A very long song, with seven stanza with eight lines each, it was shortened in 1909 by another member of the Branko association, Dragomir Brzak, to four stanza with four lines each. This version, with the name Oj Srbijo (O, Serbia) entered the school program prior to World War I. It was very popular during the Balkan Wars and World War I, having entered the repertoire of the Royal Guard. It was the opening song in a 24 June 1917 concert of the Serbian Royal Guard in Versaille. During World War II, it was the unofficial anthem of the Serbian puppet Council of Ministers. It has been theorized that the original writer, Luka Sarić, was a pseudonym, since no information has been found on him; it has been assumed that Prince Mihailo Obrenović was the writer, his 1861 song Što se bore misli moje having the same rhythm.

Lyrics

1909 version

Original 1860 version

See also
Bože pravde
March on the Drina
There, Far Away

References

Sources

Serbian patriotic songs
Songs about Serbia